Sydney is well endowed with open spaces and has many natural areas. Many of these exist even within the compact city centre. These include the Chinese Garden of Friendship and Hyde Park (which is named after London's Hyde Park). Completing Sydney's wide array of green spaces, the leader is the Royal Botanical Gardens, with its large amount of green spaces, lush plants and colourful flowers.

Although Sydney developed organically after the arrival of the First Fleet, the city parks and open spaces were a part of early town planning to provide relief from the bustle and monotony of the city streets. Hyde Park is the oldest park in the city.

Largest parks in Sydney metropolitan area

Largest parks in the City of Sydney area

Parks and reserves
The following is an incomplete list of parks and reserves in Sydney:

 Alexandria Park
Anderson Park, Neutral Bay
 Angophora Reserve
 Arthur McElhone Reserve
 Auburn Botanical Gardens
 Australian Botanic Garden Mount Annan
 Badangi Reserve
 Balfour Street Park
 Ballast Point
 Balls Head Reserve
 Barangaroo Reserve
 Beare Park
 Bede Spillane Gardens
 Belmore Park
 Ben Buckler Gun Battery
 Bents Basin State Conservation Area
 Berowra Valley Regional Park
 Berry Island Reserve
 Bicentennial Park
 Brickpit Ring Walk
 Louise Sauvage Pathway
 Bicentennial Square
 Birchgrove Park
 Botany Bay National Park
 Bradley's Head
 Brenan Park
 Brightmore reserve
 Burwood Park
 Carss Cottage
 Centenary Park
 Centennial Parklands
 Centennial Park
 Moore Park
 Queens Park
 Central Gardens Nature Reserve
 Chinese Garden of Friendship
 Cremorne Point Reserve
Robertsons Point
 Chipping Norton Lake
 Cooks River/Castlereagh Ironbark ecological community
 The Domain
 Fagan Park
 Fairfield Park Precinct
 Ferndale Park
 First Fleet Park, 
 Fred Hollows Reserve
 Frog Hollow Reserve, 
 Garawarra State Conservation Area
 Garigal National Park
 Garrison Point
 George Kendall Riverside Park
 Georges River National Park
 The Goods Line
 Green Park, Darlinghurst
 Harmony Park, 
 Heathcote National Park
 Hyde Park
 Iloura Reserve
 Jessie Street Gardens
 Joseph Banks Native Plants Reserve, Kareela
 Kellys Bush Park
 Koala Park Sanctuary
 Ku-ring-gai Chase National Park
 Lake Parramatta Reserve
 Lane Cove Bushland Park
 Lane Cove National Park
 Leacock Regional Park
 Lower Prospect Canal Reserve
 Macquarie Place Park
 Magdala Park
 McKell Park
 McLeod Reserve
 Moore Reserve
 Moore Reserve, Oatley
 Mortdale Memorial Park
 Neild Park
 Nielsen Park
 Nurragingy Reserve
 Oatley Park
 Oatley Pleasure Grounds
 Oatley Point Reserve
 Observatory Park, Sydney
 Oxford Falls Peace Park
 Paddington Reservoir
 Parramatta River Regional Park
 Penrith Lakes Regional Park 
 Prince Alfred Park
 Prince Alfred Square
 Prospect Hill
 Prospect Nature Reserve
 Pyrmont Point Park 
 Queen Elizabeth Park
 Redfern Park
 Rockdale Bicentennial Park
 Rofe Park
 Rosford Street Reserve
 Rouse Hill Regional Park 
 Royal Botanical Gardens
 Rushcutters Bay Park
 Smoothey Park
 St Leonards Park
 St Leonards Park
 St Thomas Rest Park
 Sydney Cove West Archaeological Precinct
 Sydney Harbour National Park
 Sydney Park
 Sydney Zoo
 Tania Park
 Taronga Zoo Sydney
 Terry Lamb Complex
 Victoria Park, Camperdown
 Wadim (Bill) Jegorow Reserve
 Wallumatta Nature Reserve
 Walter Burley Griffin Incinerator, Willoughby
 Waverley Cemetery
 Waverley Park
 Wentworth Park
 Western Sydney Parklands
 Wetherill Park Nature Reserve
 Wild Life Sydney
 William Howe Regional Park 
 Wolli Creek Regional Park
 Wynyard Park, Sydney
 Yellomundee Regional Park
 Yurulbin Park

See also
 Protected areas of New South Wales

References

External links
 Centennial Parklands
 Royal Botanic Gardens
 
 

 
Lists of parks in Australia
Lists of tourist attractions in Sydney
Sydney-related lists
Sydney